Cheatahs were a British shoegaze band formed in London, England in 2009.

History
Three of the four members of Cheatahs hailed from different countries: vocalist Nathan Hewitt from Edmonton, Alberta, Canada; bassist Dean Reid from San Diego, California; and drummer Marc Raue from Dresden, Germany.

Hewitt and Wignall first met in 2006, recruiting friends Reid and Raue a few years later.

Their first release, the "Warrior" single, was issued in 2009, followed by the Coare and Sans EPs. The latter two were compiled as Extended Plays in 2013.

The band released their eponymous debut full-length album on Wichita Recordings in early 2014, supported by tours of the United States and Europe.

Their fourth EP, Sunne, was released on 23 February 2015. On 31 March 2015 they announced its follow-up, 紫 (Murasaki), inspired by Japanese novelist Murasaki Shikibu, and in particular, her novel The Tale of Genji.

On 18 August 2015, Cheatahs previewed new song "Seven Sisters" and announced that their second full-length album, Mythologies, would be released on 30 October by Wichita.

Discography

Studio albums
 Cheatahs (2014, Wichita Recordings)
 Mythologies (2015, Wichita Recordings)

Compilation albums
 Extended Plays (2013, Wichita Recordings)

Singles and EPs
 "Warrior" single (2009, Young and Lost Club)
 Coared EP (2012, Marshall Teller Records) 
 Sans EP (2012, Wichita Recordings)
 "Cut the Grass" single (2013, Wichita Recordings)
 "Get Tight" single (2014, Wichita Recordings)
 Sunne EP (2015, Wichita Recordings)
Sunne E.P. Remixes EP (2015, Wichita Recordings)
 紫 (Murasaki) EP (2015, Wichita Recordings)

Members
Nathan Hewitt – vocals, guitar
James Wignall – vocals, guitar, tapes, keyboards
Dean Reid – bass, vocals, keyboards
Marc Raue – drums, tapes, keyboards

References

External links

Cheatahs at Wichita Recordings

Musical groups from London
Musical groups established in 2009
British indie rock groups
Wichita Recordings artists